Pello is a smaller locality in Övertorneå Municipality, Norrbotten County, Sweden. It is located on the shore of the Torne River, opposite to Pello, Finland. The locality has a population of 160.

References

Populated places in Övertorneå Municipality
Norrbotten
Populated places in Arctic Sweden